The men's individual all-around competition was one of eight events for male competitors in artistic gymnastics at the 1968 Summer Olympics in Mexico City. It was held on 22 and 24 October at the Auditorio Nacional. There were 117 competitors from 28 nations. Each nation entered a team of six gymnasts or up to three individual gymnasts. The event was won by Sawao Kato of Japan, the nation's second consecutive victory in the event. Kato's teammate Akinori Nakayama took bronze. Mikhail Voronin of the Soviet Union took silver. It was the fifth consecutive Games with a Soviet gymnast on the podium in the men's all-around and the fourth consecutive Games with a Japanese gymnast there; no gymnast from any other nation medaled in the men's all-around from 1956 to 1976. In 1960 and 1964, the two nations had taken 8 of the top 10 places both Games, with Yugoslavia's Miroslav Cerar and Italy's Franco Menichelli the only two breaking up the Japanese–Soviet dominance; this time, Menichelli did not finish all exercises and Cerar was the only person from outside the Soviet Union or Japan in the top 10 as those two nations took 9 of the top 10 places in the event.

Background

This was the 15th appearance of the men's individual all-around. The first individual all-around competition had been held in 1900, after the 1896 competitions featured only individual apparatus events. A men's individual all-around has been held every Games since 1900.

Four of the top 10 gymnasts from the 1964 Games returned: gold medalist Yukio Endo of Japan, silver medalist Viktor Lisitsky of the Soviet Union, fifth-place finisher Franco Menichelli of Italy, and seventh-place finisher Miroslav Cerar of Yugoslavia. Endo, Cerar, and Menichelli had all been in the top 10 in 1960 as well. Soviet gymnast Mikhail Voronin was the reigning (1966) World Champion, with Japan's Shuji Tsurumi and Akinori Nakayama finishing second and third.

Ecuador made its debut in the event. East and West Germany competed separately for the first time. France and Italy both made their 13th appearance, tied for most among nations.

Competition format

All entrants in the gymnastics competitions performed both a compulsory exercise and a voluntary exercise for each apparatus. The scores for all 12 exercises were summed to give an individual all-around score.

These exercise scores were also used for qualification for the new apparatus finals. The two exercises (compulsory and voluntary) for each apparatus were summed to give an apparatus score; the top 6 in each apparatus participated in the finals; others were ranked 7th through 117th. There was no all-around final.

Exercise scores ranged from 0 to 10, apparatus scores from 0 to 20, and individual totals from 0 to 120.

Schedule

All times are Central Standard Time (UTC-6)

Results

References

External links
Official Olympic Report
www.gymnasticsresults.com
www.gymn-forum.net

Men's artistic individual all-around
Men's events at the 1968 Summer Olympics